The following are the public holidays in Mongolia and other special days.

Public Holidays

1. Based on the non-Gregorian Mongolian calendar (Bilgiin toolol)

Other special days and celebrations
Constitution Day (January 13)
Patriots' Day (March 1)
Mongolian military day (March 18)
Health Day (April 7)
Intellectual Property Day (April 26)
Family Day (May 15)
National literary culture and book days (Saturday and Sunday of third week of May and September)
State Flag Day (July 10)
Youth Day (August 25)
New harvest days (September 5 – October 20)
Repression Victims' Day (September 10)
Environment Safety Day (fourth week of September)
Elders' Day (October 1)
Capital City Day (October 29)
October Revolution Day (November 7)
Democracy and Human Rights Day (December 10)

Notes

References
Mongolian Legal Info Network

 
Mongolia
Mongolian culture